Ten Days That Shook the World (1919) is a book by the American journalist and socialist John Reed. Here, Reed presented a firsthand account of the 1917 Russian October Revolution. Reed followed many of the most prominent Bolsheviks closely during his time in Russia.

Background
John Reed was on an assignment for The Masses, a magazine of socialist politics, when he was reporting on the Russian Revolution. Although Reed stated that he had "tried to see events with the eye of a conscientious reporter, interested in setting down the truth" during the time of the event, he stated in the preface that "in the struggle my sympathies were not neutral" (since the book primarily shares the perspective of the Russian working class).

Before John Reed left for Russia, the Espionage Act was passed on June 15, 1917. This provided for fines and imprisonment as a punishment for interference with the recruiting of soldiers and prohibited the mailing of any newspaper or magazine that promoted such sentiments. The U.S. Post Office was also given permission to deny any mailing disqualified by these standards from further postal delivery, and then to disqualify a magazine because it had missed a mailing (owing to the ban) and could therefore be no longer considered a "regular publication". The Masses was thereby forced by the United States federal government to cease publication during the autumn of 1917, after the staff refused to change the magazine's policy against World War I. The Liberator, a magazine founded by Max Eastman and controlled by him and his sister, published Reed's Russian Revolution accounts instead. In an effort to ensure the magazine's survival, Eastman compromised and tempered its views.

Reed returned from Russia during April 1918 via Kristiania in Norway. Since February 23, he had been prohibited from traveling either to America or Russia by the United States Department of State. His trunk of notes and materials about the revolution (which included Russian handbills, newspapers, and written speeches) were seized by custom officials, who interrogated him for four hours over his activities in Russia during the previous eight months. Michael Gold, an eyewitness to Reed's arrival to Manhattan, recalls how "a swarm of Department of Justice men stripped him, went over every inch of his clothes and baggage, and put him through the usual inquisition. Reed had been sick with ptomaine on the boat. The inquisition had also been painful." Back home during mid-summer 1918, Reed, worried that "his vivid impressions on the revolution would fade," fought to regain his papers from the possession of the government, which long refused to return them.

Reed did not receive his materials until seven months later in November. Max Eastman recalls a meeting with John Reed in the middle of Sheridan Square during the period of time when Reed isolated himself writing the book.

Critical response
The account has received mixed responses since its publication in 1919, resulting in a wide range of critical reviews ranging negative to positive. It was overall received positively by critics at the time of its first publication, despite some critics’ opposition to Reed's politics.

George F. Kennan, an American diplomat and historian who was opposed to Bolshevism and is known best as a developer of the idea of "containment” of Communism, praised the book. “Reed’s account of the events of that time rises above every other contemporary record for its literary power, its penetration, its command of detail” and would be “remembered when all others are forgotten”. Kennan considered it as “a reflection of blazing honesty and a purity of idealism that did unintended credit to the American society that produced him, the merits of which he himself understood so poorly”. In 1999, The New York Times reported New York University's “Top 100 Works of Journalism,” works published in the United States during the 20th century, scored Ten Days that Shook the World as seventh. Project director Mitchell Stephens explains the judges’ decision:

Not all responses were positive. Joseph Stalin argued in 1924 that Reed was misleading in regards to Leon Trotsky. The book portrays Trotsky (at that time commander of the Red Army) as co-director of the revolution with Lenin, and mentions Stalin only twice, one of those occasions being in a recitation of names. Russian writer Anatoly Rybakov elaborates on the Stalinist USSR’s ban of Ten Days That Shook The World: “The main task was to build a mighty socialist state. For that, mighty power was needed. Stalin was at the head of that power, which means that he stood at its source with Lenin. Together with Lenin he led the October Revolution. John Reed had presented the history of October differently. That wasn’t the John Reed we needed.” After Stalin's death, the book was allowed to recirculate in the USSR.

In contrast to Stalin's objections, Lenin had a different attitude towards the book. At the end of 1919, Lenin had written an Introduction to it (quoted further below).

Stalin remained silent on the topic at the time, and only spoke against it after Lenin's death in 1924.

Publication

After its first publication, Reed returned to Russia during the autumn of 1919, delighted to learn that Vladimir Lenin had taken time to read the book. Furthermore, Lenin agreed to write an introduction that first appeared in the 1922 edition published by Boni & Liveright (New York):

In his preface to Animal Farm titled "Freedom of the Press" (1945), George Orwell claimed that the British Communist Party published a version which omitted Lenin's introduction and mention of Trotsky.

Aftermath 
In the book, Reed refers several times to a planned sequel, titled Kornilov to Brest-Litovsk, which was not finished. In 1920, soon after the completion of the original book, Reed died. He was interred in the Kremlin Wall Necropolis in Moscow in a site reserved normally only for the most prominent Bolshevik leaders.

Film versions

Dramatizations
Famous Soviet movie director Sergei Eisenstein filmed the book as October: Ten Days That Shook the World in 1928.

John Reed's own exploits and parts of the book itself were the basis for the 1981 Warren Beatty movie Reds, which he directed, co-wrote and featured in. Similarly, the Soviet moviemaker, Sergei Bondarchuk, used it as the basis of his 1982 movie Red Bells II. The original Red Bells had covered events earlier in Reed's life.

Documentaries
The English network Granada Television presented a 1967 feature-length documentary. This was narrated by Orson Welles.

References in media
Socialist/communist screenwriter Lester Cole referenced the title of the book in his script for the 1946 movie Blood on the Sun, though in a different context. The main characters (played by James Cagney and Sylvia Sidney) plan on spending ten days together, causing one to utter the phrase.

See also

Notes and references

Notes

References

External links
Ten Days that Shook the World at Wikisource
 
 
Ten Days That Shook the World at Project Gutenberg
, a PDF edition of the book published in 1987 by Progress Publishers

1919 non-fiction books
American political books
Books about communism
Books about the Russian Revolution
Boni & Liveright books